The 1976 Arizona Wildcats baseball team represented the University of Arizona in the 1976 NCAA Division I baseball season. The team was coached by Jerry Kindall in his 4th season at Arizona.

The Wildcats won the College World Series, defeating the Eastern Michigan Hurons in the championship game.

Roster

Schedule 

! style="background:#C41E3A;color:white;"| Regular Season
|- valign="top" 

|- align="center" bgcolor="#ddffdd"
| February 13 ||  || 13–2 || 1–0 || –
|- align="center" bgcolor="#ddffdd"
| February 14 || Pepperdine || 8–0 || 2–0 || –
|- align="center" bgcolor="#ddffdd"
| February 14 || Pepperdine || 15–3 || 3–0 || –
|- align="center" bgcolor="#ddffdd"
| February 16 ||  || 17–10 || 4–0 || –
|- align="center" bgcolor="#ddffdd"
| February 17 || Cal State Dominguez Hills || 11–6 || 5–0 || –
|- align="center" bgcolor="#ffdddd"
| February 20 ||  || 3–5 || 5–1 || –
|- align="center" bgcolor="#ddffdd"
| February 21 || Azusa Pacific || 9–0 || 6–1 || –
|- align="center" bgcolor="#ddffdd"
| February 21 || Azusa Pacific || 10–0 || 7–1 || –
|- align="center" bgcolor="#ddffdd"
| February 23 ||  || 4–3 || 8–1 || –
|- align="center" bgcolor="#ddffdd"
| February 24 || Cal Poly Pomona || 12–7 || 9–1 || –
|- align="center" bgcolor="#ddffdd"
| February 25 || Cal Poly Pomona || 11–7 || 10–1 || –
|- align="center" bgcolor="#ffdddd"
| February 26 ||  || 6–7 || 10–2 || –
|- align="center" bgcolor="#ddffdd"
| February 27 || San Diego State || 11–5 || 11–2 || –
|- align="center" bgcolor="#ddffdd"
| February 28 || San Diego State || 5–3 || 12–2 || –
|- align="center" bgcolor="#ddffdd"
| February 28 || San Diego State || 14–13 || 13–2 || –
|-

|- align="center" bgcolor="#ffdddd"
| March 1 || at  || 6–7 || 13–3 || –
|- align="center" bgcolor="#ddffdd"
| March 2 || Grand Canyon || 15–0 || 14–3 || –
|- align="center" bgcolor="#ddffdd"
| March 5 ||  || 8–5 || 15–3 || –
|- align="center" bgcolor="#ddffdd"
| March 6 || La Verne || 9–6 || 16–3 || –
|- align="center" bgcolor="#ddffdd"
| March 8 ||  || 7–1 || 17–3 || –
|- align="center" bgcolor="#ddffdd"
| March 8 || Oklahoma || 6–3 || 18–3 || –
|- align="center" bgcolor="#ddffdd"
| March 9 || Oklahoma || 14–1 || 19–3 || –
|- align="center" bgcolor="#ddffdd"
| March 9 || Oklahoma || 9–8 || 20–3 || –
|- align="center" bgcolor="#ddffdd"
| March 11 || at San Diego State || 7–1 || 21–3 || –
|- align="center" bgcolor="#ffdddd"
| March 12 || at San Diego State || 1–5 || 21–4 || –
|- align="center" bgcolor="#ffdddd"
| March 13 || at San Diego State || 4–6 || 21–5 || –
|- align="center" bgcolor="#ddffdd"
| March 13 || at San Diego State || 6–4 || 22–5 || –
|- align="center" bgcolor="#ffdddd"
| March 15 || at Pepperdine || 3–4 || 22–6 || –
|- align="center" bgcolor="#ffdddd"
| March 13 || at  || 0–5 || 22–7 || –
|- align="center" bgcolor="#ddffdd"
| March 16 || at Pepperdine || 1–0 || 23–7 || –
|- align="center" bgcolor="#ffdddd"
| March 17 ||  || 3–4 || 23–8 || –
|- align="center" bgcolor="#ffdddd"
| March 18 || Southern California || 4–6 || 23–9 || –
|- align="center" bgcolor="#ddffdd"
| March 19 || La Verne || 10–5 || 24–9 || –
|- align="center" bgcolor="#ffdddd"
| March 20 || La Verne || 6–10 || 24–10 || –
|- align="center" bgcolor="#ddffdd"
| March 20 || La Verne || 4–3 || 25–10 || –
|- align="center" bgcolor="#ddffdd"
| March 23 ||  || 17–2 || 26–10 || –
|- align="center" bgcolor="#ddffdd"
| March 25 || Southern California || 8–0 || 27–10 || –
|- align="center" bgcolor="#ddffdd"
| March 26 || Southern California || 8–5 || 28–10 || –
|- align="center" bgcolor="#ddffdd"
| March 27 || Southern California || 8–4 || 29–10 || –
|-

|- align="center" bgcolor="#ddffdd"
| April 1 || vs.  || 14–6 || 30–10 || –
|- align="center" bgcolor="#ddffdd"
| April 2 || vs. Northern Arizona || 9–3 || 31–10 || –
|- align="center" bgcolor="#ddffdd"
| April 3 || vs. Northern Arizona || 6–0 || 32–10 || –
|- align="center" bgcolor="#ffdddd"
| April 8 || at Arizona State || 2–7 || 32–11 || 0–1
|- align="center" bgcolor="#ffdddd"
| April 9 || at Arizona State || 9–11 || 32–12 || 0–2
|- align="center" bgcolor="#ffdddd"
| April 10 || at Arizona State || 5–6 || 32–13 || 0–3
|- align="center" bgcolor="#ddffdd"
| April 17 ||  || 15–3 || 33–13 || 1–3
|- align="center" bgcolor="#ddffdd"
| April 17 || UTEP || 8–1 || 34–13 || 2–3
|- align="center" bgcolor="#ddffdd"
| April 18 || UTEP || 12–1 || 35–13 || 3–3
|- align="center" bgcolor="#ddffdd"
| April 23 ||  || 5–3 || 36–13 || 4–3
|- align="center" bgcolor="#ddffdd"
| April 24 || New Mexico || 8–6 || 37–13 || 5–3
|- align="center" bgcolor="#ddffdd"
| April 24 || New Mexico || 8–3 || 38–13 || 6–3
|- align="center" bgcolor="#ddffdd"
| April 30 || at UTEP || 16–0 || 39–13 || 7–3
|-

|- align="center" bgcolor="#ddffdd"
| May 1 || at UTEP || 3–1 || 40–13 || 8–3
|- align="center" bgcolor="#ddffdd"
| May 1 || at UTEP || 10–3 || 41–13 || 9–3
|- align="center" bgcolor="#ddffdd"
| May 7 || at New Mexico || 6–3 || 42–13 || 10–3
|- align="center" bgcolor="#ddffdd"
| May 8 || at New Mexico || 6–3 || 43–13 || 11–3
|- align="center" bgcolor="#ddffdd"
| May 9 || at New Mexico || 10–4 || 44–13 || 12–3
|- align="center" bgcolor="#ffdddd"
| May 13 || Arizona State || 1–2 || 44–14 || 12–4
|- align="center" bgcolor="#ffdddd"
| May 14 || Arizona State || 4–9 || 44–15 || 12–5
|- align="center" bgcolor="#ffdddd"
| May 15 || Arizona State || 9–14 || 44–16 || 12–6
|-

|- align="center" bgcolor="#ddffdd"
| May 21 || vs.  || 19–0 || 45–16
|- align="center" bgcolor="#ddffdd"
| May 22 || vs. Wyoming || 6–2 || 46–16
|- align="center" bgcolor="#ddffdd"
| May 24 || vs.  || 7–6 || 47–16
|- align="center" bgcolor="#ddffdd"
| May 25 || vs. BYU || 4–0 || 48–16
|-

|- align="center" bgcolor="#ddffdd"
| May 28 || vs.  || 5–0 || 49–16
|- align="center" bgcolor="#ddffdd"
| May 29 || vs.  || 10–1 || 50–16
|- align="center" bgcolor="#ddffdd"
| May 30 || vs.  || 10–1 || 51–16
|-

|- align="center" bgcolor="ffdddd"
| June 12 || vs. Arizona State || Rosenblatt Stadium || 6–7 || 51–16
|- align="center" bgcolor="ddffdd"
| June 13 || vs. Oklahoma || Rosenblatt Stadium || 10–2 || 52–17
|- align="center" bgcolor="ddffdd"
| June 14 || vs. Clemson || Rosenblatt Stadium || 10–6 || 53–17
|- align="center" bgcolor="ddffdd"
| June 16 || vs. Eastern Michigan || Rosenblatt Stadium || 11–6 || 54–17
|- align="center" bgcolor="ddffdd"
| June 17 || vs. Arizona State || Rosenblatt Stadium || 5–1 || 55–17
|- align="center" bgcolor="ddffdd"
| June 18 || vs. Eastern Michigan || Rosenblatt Stadium || 7–1 || 56–17
|-

Awards and honors 
Bob Challk
 College World Series All-Tournament Team

Craig Giola
 First Team All-WAC South

Ron Hassey
 College World Series All-Tournament Team
 First Team All-WAC South

Steve Powers
 College World Series Most Outstanding Player

Dave Stegman
 First Team All-American
 College World Series All-Tournament Team
 First Team All-WAC South

Pete Van Horne
 College World Series All-Tournament Team

Glenn Wendt
 First Team All-WAC South

Wildcats in the 1976 MLB Draft 
The following members of the Arizona Wildcats baseball program were drafted in the 1976 Major League Baseball Draft.

References 

NCAA Division I Baseball Championship seasons
Arizona Wildcats baseball seasons
College World Series seasons
1976 Western Athletic Conference baseball season
Western Athletic Conference baseball champion seasons
1976 in sports in Arizona